Penelope is a Slovak psychological drama film directed by Štefan Uher. Starring Božidara Turzonovová and Eva Kristínová, the movie was released on January 20, 1978.

Similarly as with some of previous works directed by Uher, such as Slnko v sieti (1962), he reunited with screenwriter Alfonz Bednár and cinematographer Stanislav Szomolányi.

Plot
Restorer Eva Kamenická (Božidara Turzonovová) arrives to the village to repair frescoes of the heroines of ancient myths for the local castle. In daily life of the village inhabitants Eva soon finds some elements of ancient tragedy, especially in fate of a lonely old lady named Malovcová (Eva Kristínová). The woman, commonly referred to by locals as "Waitress of Change", awaits the return of her husband and son, who had gone to work in America twenty years ago. Eva sees in her a picture of the devoted and patient "Penelope", whose courage and faith impress young restorer. Experience gained while staying in the country turns into her own life decision. Not long after she becomes close with the Secretary of the Municipal Committee, Viktor (Michal Dočolomanský), she decides to leave her daughter Mima (Jana Čeligová) with selfish husband and start a new life.

Cast
 Božidara Turzonovová - Eva Kamenická, restorer
 Eva Kristínová - Mrs. Malovcová, "Waitress of Change"/"Penelopa"
 Gustáv Valach - Kuzma, Sr.
 Michal Dočolomanský - Viktor Kuzma, Secretary of the Municipal Committee
 Ilja Prachař - Mišo Bajzlík
 Dušan Blaškovič - Vertel
 Milan Kiš - Gracík
 Anton Šulík - Lovčan
 Leopold Haverl - Stanko
 Jaroslav Vrzala - Nemlaha
 Igor Čillík - Ondro
 Jiřina Jelenská - Zora/Zuza
 Jana Nagyová - Verona
 Michal Nesvadba - Fero

Uncredited
 Igor Hrabinský - Miro
 Jana Čeligová - Mima, Eva's daughter
 Elena Volková - Mrs. Kuzmová
 Štefan Mišovic - Blažej
 Ján Géc - publican
 Jozef Mifkovič - publican
 Emília Halamová - Amerikán's wife
 Vladimír Macko - police officer

 Ľubomír Zaťovič - Molčan
 František Desset - Berto Bajzík
 Lenka Kořínková - girl
 Štefan Turňa
 Jaroslav Černík
 Ľudovít Greššo - Mišo Bajzík 
 Hana Kostolanská - Kuzmová 
 Dušan Kaprálik - Fero 
 Katarína Orbánová - Zuza

Awards

See also
 The Sun in a Net (1962s work by the same tandem Uher-Bednár-Szomolányi)

References
General

Specific

External links
 

1978 films
Czechoslovak drama films
Slovak drama films
Slovak-language films
1970s psychological drama films
Films directed by Štefan Uher
1978 drama films